The Common Informers Act 1588 (31 Eliz 1 c 5) was an Act of the Parliament of England.

The whole Act was repealed by section 2 of, and Schedule 2 to, the Statute Law Revision Act 1959.

References
Halsbury's Statutes,

Acts of the Parliament of England (1485–1603)
1588 in law
1588 in England